Dyer is an unincorporated town, located in Fish Lake Valley, Esmeralda County, Nevada, United States. It had a population of 324 as of the 2018 American Community Survey. The town serves the surrounding area's sparse rural population of mainly ranchers and indigenous Paiute people. The town has a gas station/store, cafe, post office and airport.

Dyer is located on State Route 264, near Nevada's border with California. The town is part of the Dyer Census Designated Place.

Demographics

History
The post office at Dyer has been in operation since 1889. The community took its name from nearby Dyer's Ranch.

Education
Residents are zoned to the Esmeralda County School District for grades K-8.

High school students in the entire county go to Tonopah High School of Nye County School District.

Climate
The Köppen Climate System classifies the weather in this area as semi-arid, abbreviated BSk.  This climate type occurs primarily on the periphery of true deserts in low-latitude semiarid steppe regions.

References

Census-designated places in Esmeralda County, Nevada
Census-designated places in Nevada